is the traditional Japanese art of decorative garnishing. Examples of this include carving traditional images (flowers, cranes, turtles and dragons) into skins of fruit and vegetables, as well as carving vegetables (such as daikon, carrot, eggplant) into attractive shapes such as flowers, twists, and fan shapes. These are commonly served as a garnish on the same plate as the meal, or on a small side plate. Carving is done using a kitchen knife. Mukimono is different from Thai fruit carving, which uses a sharp thin knife specifically designed for this purpose.

Cutting food in Mukimono style is a way to create a sense of the four seasons. The taste of the four seasons improves the appearance of the cuisine and plays a major role in improving the flavor.

See also 

 Vegetable carving
 Fruit carving
 Night of the Radishes

References

External links
 Mukimono, the grandfather of the Fine Art of Thai Fruit and Vegetable Carving

Japanese cuisine
Japanese cuisine terms
Food and drink decorations